Vilhelm Lindgrén (3 July 1895 – 26 July 1960) was a Finnish breaststroke swimmer. He competed in two events at the 1912 Summer Olympics.

References

External links
 

1895 births
1960 deaths
Finnish male breaststroke swimmers
Olympic swimmers of Finland
Swimmers at the 1912 Summer Olympics
Sportspeople from Tampere